The Mission Hills Country Club is a country club in the western United States, located in Rancho Mirage, California, southeast of Palm Springs.

Overview
Among the facilities at the club are 3 championship golf courses (54 holes), 27 tennis courts of various surfaces, a spa and sports center. It has been owned by ClubCorp since 1993. The tennis venue of the club hosted finals of the Davis Cup in 1978.

Golf
The first course at Mission Hills was designed by Desmond Muirhead and opened  in 1971. It is over this course, now known as the Dinah Shore Tournament Course, that the Chevron Championship, one of the five major championships in women's professional golf, was played. It debuted in April 1972 as the "Colgate-Dinah Shore Winner's Circle," the richest event on the LPGA Tour, and became a major in 1983 through 2022.

The second course was designed by golf legend Arnold Palmer and opened in 1979. A third course was added in 1988, and originally called the Dinah Shore Course, but with Dinah Shore's name being transferred to the old course after her death in 1994, it was renamed as the Pete Dye Challenge Course.

From 1988 to 2022, the Chevron Championship winner took the traditional jump into Poppie's Pond, next to the bridge at the 18th green. Amy Alcott was the first in 1988, and it had been an annual ritual from 1994 to 2022, when Jennifer Kupcho became the final winner to do it.

In 2023, the PGA Tour Champions will host the Galleri Classic on the Dinah Shore Tournament Course.

Scorecards

References

External links 

Golf clubs and courses in California
Sports venues in Riverside County, California
Tennis venues in California
Rancho Mirage, California
1978 Davis Cup
Sports venues completed in 1971
1971 establishments in California